Vredenburg is a town in South Africa.

Vredenburg may also refer to:

 Vredenburg (castle), castle in Utrecht, Netherlands
 Muziekcentrum Vredenburg, a music venue in Utrecht, designed by Herman Hertzberger; mostly demolished in 2008
 TivoliVredenburg, music venue in Utrecht, Netherlands
 Harrie Vredenburg (b. 1952), Canadian academic
 Van Vredenburg Farm, historic house in Dutchess County, New York

See also
Vredenburgh (disambiguation)